Saskatoon Willowgrove is a provincial electoral district for the Legislative Assembly of Saskatchewan, Canada. It succeeded the former Saskatoon Silver Springs riding and was first contested in the 2016 election.

Members of the Legislative Assembly

Election results

References

Saskatchewan provincial electoral districts
Politics of Saskatoon